Kelty Apperson (born October 26, 1994) is a Canadian ice hockey forward, currently affiliated with the Calgary chapter of the Professional Women's Hockey Players Association (PWHPA). She won the Clarkson Cup with the Calgary Inferno in 2019.

Career  
Apperson served as captain for the St. Thomas (Canada) Tommies women's ice hockey program represting St. Thomas University in Fredericton, New Brunswick, a member of the Atlantic University Sport regional association of U Sports. She was named Atlantic University Sport MVP in 2016. In her final season of university hockey, she was named to the Canadian roster that competed in Ice hockey at the 2017 Winter Universiade

After graduating from university, she signed her first professional contract with the Calgary Inferno of the Canadian Women's Hockey League (CWHL). She scored 6 points in 25 games in her second CWHL season, as the club won the Clarkson Cup. 

After the CWHL collapsed in May 2019, Apperson joined the ForTheGame movement. Eight days later, she became the first ForTheGame player to sign an overseas contract when she signed with SDE Hockey in Sweden. She scored 18 points in 36 in her first season with SDE, serving as an alternate captain as the club made the SDHL playoffs for the first in its history.

International   
Apperson represented Team Canada at the 2017 Winter Universiade, scoring seven points in five games as the country won a silver medal.

Career statistics

Awards and honors
2015–16 Atlantic University Sport Most Valuable Player
Atlantic University Sport First Team All-Star: 2015–16 and 2016–17
2016 and 2017 St. Thomas University Tommies Coastal Graphics Female Athlete of the Year
Player of the Game: 2016 CIS Women's Ice Hockey Championship - March 18: McGill vs. St. Thomas

References

External links
 

1994 births
Living people
Calgary Inferno players
Canadian expatriate ice hockey players in Sweden
Canadian women's ice hockey forwards
Clarkson Cup champions
People from the Regional Municipality of Waterloo
Professional Women's Hockey Players Association players
SDE Hockey players
St. Thomas (Canada) Tommies women's ice hockey players
St. Thomas University (New Brunswick) alumni
Universiade medalists in ice hockey
Universiade silver medalists for Canada
Competitors at the 2017 Winter Universiade